Pilea, with 600–715 species, is the largest genus of flowering plants in the nettle family Urticaceae.

It is distributed throughout the tropics, subtropics, and warm temperate regions (with the exception of Australia and New Zealand).

Description
The majority of species are succulent shade-loving herbaceous plants or shrubs, which are easily distinguished from other Urticaceae by the combination of opposite leaves (with rare exceptions) with a single ligulate intrapetiolar stipule in each leaf axil and cymose or paniculate inflorescences (again with rare exceptions).

Uses
Pilea is of little economic importance; one species is used in Chinese traditional medicine (P. plataniflora).

Horticulture
Six species have horticultural value (P. cadierei, P. grandifolia, P. involucrata, P. microphylla, P. nummulariifolia, and P. peperomioides),
Some pileas are grown for their ornamental foliage which is shaped like lily-pads.

The ASPCA includes many peperomia species in the list of plants that are non-toxic to pets.

Systematics
The genus has attracted little monographic attention since Weddell (1869), and the majority of taxonomic contributions have come from floristic treatments. To date, 787 species names have been published (International Plant Names Index, 2003) and estimates for the species number range from 250 to 1000. Based on previous floristic treatments, about 30% of the species from regions not yet covered by contemporary floristic treatments may be undescribed.

The genus name Pilea is Latin for "felt cap", a reference to the calyx covering the achene.

Selected species

Pilea cadierei — aluminium plant
Pilea cataractae 
Pilea cavernicola
Pilea crassifolia
Pilea depressa
Pilea elegans
Pilea fontana
Pilea glaucophylla
Pilea grandifolia 
Pilea involucrata — friendship plant
Pilea jamesonia
Pilea laevicaulis
Pilea microphylla — artillery plant, gunpowder plant
Pilea mollis — Moon Valley plant
Pilea myriophylla
Pilea napoana
Pilea nummulariifolia — creeping Charlie
Pilea peperomioides — Chinese money plant, missionary plant
Pilea pollicaris
Pilea pumila — Canadian clearweed
Pilea repens — black-leaf panamiga
Pilea riopalenquensis
Pilea schimpfii
Pilea selbyanorum
Pilea serpyllacea
Pilea serratifolia
Pilea spruceana
Pilea topensis
Pilea trianthemoides
Pilea trichosanthes
Pilea trilobata
Pilea tungurahuae
Pilea victoriae

Fossil record
The fossil species †Pilea cantalensis was widely distributed in Europe and West Siberia during the Miocene and Pliocene. It is related to the East Asian Pilea mongolica and to the North American Pilea pumila.

References

Hortus Third, pages 872-873

USDA U.S. Dept. of Agriculture Plants Database

Further reading

 
Urticaceae genera